Hilma Aparecida Caldeira (born January 5, 1972) is a retired volleyball player from Brazil, who competed with the Brazil women's national volleyball team at the 1996 Summer Olympics in Atlanta, Georgia. There she claimed the bronze medal with the Women's National Team. She also competed at the 1992 Summer Olympics and 1994 FIVB Volleyball Women's World Championship in Brazil. On club level she played with L'Acqua di Fiori/Minas.

Clubs
  Minas Tênis Clube (1987–1995)
  Vôlei Osasco (1995–1997)
  Minas Tênis Clube (1997–1998)
  Volley Bergamo (1998–1999)
  VakıfBank S.K. (1999–2002)

References

External links
 
 
 

1972 births
Living people
Brazilian women's volleyball players
Olympic volleyball players of Brazil
Volleyball players at the 1992 Summer Olympics
Volleyball players at the 1996 Summer Olympics
Olympic bronze medalists for Brazil
Place of birth missing (living people)
Olympic medalists in volleyball
Medalists at the 1996 Summer Olympics
Pan American Games medalists in volleyball
Pan American Games gold medalists for Brazil
Volleyball players at the 1999 Pan American Games
Medalists at the 1999 Pan American Games
20th-century Brazilian women